Your Contemporary is a 1967 Soviet drama film directed by Yuli Raizman.

Plot 
The film is a continuation of 'The Communist' film. The son of Vasily Gubanov goes to Moscow with the hope of stopping the construction of his chemical enterprise, despite the huge amount of money and labor resources spent on the project...

Cast 
 Igor Vladimirov as Vassili Gubanov
 Nikolai Plotnikov as Professor Nitochkyn
 Antonina Maksimova as Yelisaveta Kondratyeva
 Nina Gulyaeva as Soyka
 Tatyana Nadezhdina as Katya
 Lyudmila Maksakova
 Nikolay Kuzmin as Samokhin

References

External links 
 

1967 films
1960s Russian-language films
Soviet drama films
1967 drama films